Bancroft is a place name-derived English surname originating in the 13th Century with three purported origins: the locale Bancroft in Ardeley, Hertfordshire; the locale of Bancroft Field in Soham, Cambridgeshire; or an Old English transliteration of the phrase "dweller by the bean field'.  Bancroft is thought to be related in origin to two other surnames, Bangcroft and Bencroft.

Notable people sharing this surname 

 The Bancroft family, previous owners of Dow Jones & Company
 Aaron Bancroft (1755–1839), Colonial American clergyman and Revolutionary War soldier
 Ann Bancroft (born 1955), American explorer
 Anne Bancroft (1931–2005), American actress
 Billy Bancroft (1871–1959), Welsh international rugby union player and county cricketer
 Cameron Bancroft (cricketer) (born 1992), Australian cricketer
 Cameron Bancroft (actor) (born 1967), Canadian actor
 Dave Bancroft (1891–1972), American baseball player and member of the Baseball Hall of Fame
 Edward Bancroft (1744–1821), American double agent in the American Revolutionary War
 Edward Nathaniel Bancroft (1772–1842), English physician, botanist, and zoologist
 Effie Bancroft (1839–1921), English actress and theatre manager
 Frederick Bancroft (educator) (1855–1929), Canadian educator
 George Bancroft (1800–1891), American historian, statesman, and Secretary of the Navy (1845–1846)
 George Bancroft (actor) (1882–1956), American actor
 Gertrude Bancroft (1908–1985), American economist
 H. Hugh Bancroft (1904–1988), British organist and composer
 Hubert Howe Bancroft (1832–1918), American historian and ethnologist
 Huldah Bancroft (died 1966), American biostatistician
 Ian Bancroft, Baron Bancroft (1922–1996), British civil servant
 Jack Bancroft (1879–1942), Welsh international rugby union player and county cricketer
 Jessie Hubbell Bancroft (1867–1952), American educator, a pioneer of physical education
 John Bancroft (bishop) (1574–1640), bishop of Oxford
 John Bancroft (dramatist) (died 1696), English dramatist
 John Bancroft (architect) (1928–2011), British architect
 John Bancroft (sexologist) (born 1936), American physician
 John Bancroft (businessman) (21st century), British businessman
 Joseph Bancroft (1836–1894), English-born Australian surgeon and parasitologist
 Lincoln Bancroft (1877–1942), American politician
 Mary Bancroft (1903–1997), American novelist and spy
 G. Michael Bancroft (born 1942), Canadian chemist and synchrotron scientist
 Natalie Bancroft (born circa 1980), American businesswoman.
 Ria Bancroft (1907–1993), New Zealand sculptor
 Richard Bancroft (1544–1610), English clergyman and Archbishop of Canterbury (1604–1610)
Ryan Bancroft (born 1989), American conductor
 Squire Bancroft (1841–1926), aka Sydney Bancroft, English actor and theatre manager.
 Stephen H. Bancroft, American theologian and educator
 Thomas Bancroft (poet) (c. 1596–1658), a 17th-century English poet.
 Thomas Bancroft (MP) (died 1636), English MP for Castle Rising
 Thomas Bancroft (priest) (1756–1811), English Anglican vicar of Bolton-le-Moors
 Tom Bancroft (born 1967), British jazz drummer and composer
 Tony Bancroft (born 1967), American animator
 Wilder Dwight Bancroft (1867–1953), American physical chemist

References 

English-language surnames